Patrick Lyons was an Australian prelate.

Patrick Lyons may also refer to:
 Patrick Lyons (bishop of Kilmore) (1875–1949), Irish prelate of the Roman Catholic Church
 Patrick H. Lyons, American politician from New Mexico
 Pat Lyons (1860–1914), baseball player
 Patrick Lyons (athletic director), American college athletics administrator

See also
 Patrick Campbell-Lyons (born 1943), composer and musician
 Patrick Lyon (disambiguation)